Jan Johnsen Sørensen (born 14 May 1955) is a Danish former football player, who played in the striker position. He most notably played professionally for Belgian club Club Brugge as well as FC Twente, Feyenoord and Ajax in the Netherlands. He played 11 matches and scored three goals for the Denmark national football team from 1977 to 1980.

Sørensen started his career with Glostrup IC before joining BK Frem in Denmark before the 1977 season. He proceeded to move abroad to play professionally for Belgian team Club Brugge in 1977. He reached the 1978 European Cup final with Club Brugge, which was lost to English club Liverpool. He played six seasons at Club Brugge, scoring a total of 63 goals in 185 matches, and winning two Belgian Jupiler League championships. He left the club in 1983, and moved to the Netherlands to play for FC Twente, Feyenoord, Excelsior and Ajax. He ended his active career with Portimonense SC in Portugal.

Following his retirement, he was appointed manager of Walsall FC in June 1997. He spent 11 months at the club, leaving again in May 1998. He later became sports director of Danish club Hvidovre IF.

Jan now runs a pub called the Prince of Wales in the Tamworth area.

Career statistics

International goals

Honours

Player 

 Club Brugge

 Belgian First Division: 1977–78, 1979–80
 Belgian Cup: 1978-79 (finalists), 1982-83 (finalists)
 Belgian Supercup : 1980
 European Champion Clubs' Cup: 1977-78 (runners-up)
 Jules Pappaert Cup: 1978
 Bruges Matins: 1979, 1981
 Japan Cup Kirin World Soccer: 1981

References

External links
Danish national team profile

1955 births
Living people
People from Glostrup Municipality
Danish men's footballers
Danish football managers
Association football forwards
Boldklubben Frem players
Club Brugge KV players
FC Twente players
Feyenoord players
Excelsior Rotterdam players
AFC Ajax players
Belgian Pro League players
Eredivisie players
Primeira Liga players
Walsall F.C. managers
Denmark international footballers
Danish expatriate men's footballers
Expatriate footballers in Belgium
Danish expatriate sportspeople in Belgium
Expatriate footballers in the Netherlands
Danish expatriate sportspeople in the Netherlands
Expatriate footballers in Portugal
Danish expatriate sportspeople in Portugal
Danish expatriate sportspeople in England
Portimonense S.C. players
Sportspeople from the Capital Region of Denmark